Courtney Florence Stewart is a Scottish professional wrestler currently signed to WWE, performs on the NXT brand under the ring name Isla Dawn.

Professional wrestling career

Independent circuit (2013–2016) 
On 17 October 2014, Stewart made her Tidal Championship Wrestling debut, defeating Ruby Summers at their Dark Waters event. On 3 March 2016, at Reckless Intent's Under Pressure event, Stewart defeated Nikki Storm in the first women's match for the promotion. On 20 March, Stewart competed in Pro-Wrestling: EVE's first all-female professional wrestling show in London titled "Let's Make History!", losing to April Davids by submission.

World Wonder Ring Stardom (2016) 
Stewart made her debut for World Wonder Ring Stardom when she was announced as one of the twelve names competing in the 2016 5★Star Grand Prix tournament. From 21 August to 9 September, she competed in the "Red Stars" block, garnering two wins and four losses, and ending with a total of four points.

WWE

Mae Young Classic (2017–2018) 
On 6 November 2017 episode of Raw, Dawn wrestled under the name Stacy Coates, losing to Asuka in a squash. Dawn competed in the 2018 Mae Young Classic tournament. She was eliminated in the first round after losing to Nicole Matthews on 8 August 2018.

NXT UK (2018–2022) 
On 18 June 2018, during day one of the United Kingdom Championship Tournament, Dawn made her debut on NXT in a triple threat match to determine the number one contender for the NXT Women's Championship, when Toni Storm defeated her and Killer Kelly. On 25 August (which aired on tape delay on 21 November), she competed in the first round of the NXT UK Women's Championship Tournament, losing to Storm. On 31 October episode of NXT UK, Dawn picked up her first televised win by defeating Nina Samuels. On 19 December episode of NXT UK, Dawn fought Rhea Ripley for the NXT UK Women's Championship in a losing effort. On 19 June 2019 episode of NXT UK, Dawn competed in a battle royal to determine the number one contender for the NXT UK Women's Championship, which was won by Kay Lee Ray. On 30 April 2020 (which was taped on 15 June 2019), Dawn fought Shayna Baszler for the NXT Women's Championship, but failed to capture the title.

On 11 February 2021 episode of NXT UK, Dawn fought against the debuting Meiko Satomura, where Dawn was defeated. In March, vignettes started airing of Dawn conducting occult readings through a ouija board and tarot cards.
On 25 March episode of NXT UK, Dawn returned and defeated Aleah James.
On 1 April episode of NXT UK, Dawn attacked the returning Emilia McKenzie, turning Dawn heel in the process. The following week, she teamed with NXT UK Women's Champion Ray and faced Satomura and McKenzie at NXT UK: Prelude, but they were defeated. On 15 April episode of NXT UK, Dawn defeated McKenzie. On 13 May episode of NXT UK, Dawn competed in a gauntlet match to determine the number one contender for the NXT UK Women's Championship, which was won by Satomura. The following months saw Dawn take items from various wrestlers in the women's division for a ritual.

On 24 February 2022 episode of NXT UK, Dawn interrupted NXT UK Women's Champion Meiko Satomura's celebration and wanted a shot at her title, then she attacked Satomura and stole her flowers. She received her title match on 24 March episode of NXT UK, but she lost. After the match, Dawn stole the title belt. On 14 April episode of NXT UK, Dawn returned the belt to Satomura but demanded another match under her own 'chaotic' rules, then she spat black mist into Satomura's face. On 5 May episode of NXT UK, Dawn got her rematch against Satomura in a World of Darkness match, but failed to win the title again. On 23 June episode of NXT UK, Dawn returned and defeated Myla Grace. On 21 July episode of NXT UK, Dawn defeated NXT 2.0's Fallon Henley. On 4 August episode of NXT UK, Dawn fought Blair Davenport to determine the number one contender for the NXT UK Women's Championship, ending in a no contest. On the final episode of NXT UK, Dawn competed in a four-way elimination match to determine the number one contender to the NXT UK Women's Championship, which was won by Davenport.

NXT (2022–present) 
On 15 November episode of NXT, Dawn made her first appearance on the American brand by interfering in the Last Woman Standing match for the NXT Women's Championship, spitting black mist into Alba Fyre's face, then pushing her off a ladder into the announce table, allowing Mandy Rose to retain her title. She made her in-ring debut on 6 December episode of NXT by defeating Thea Hail. After the match, Dawn was attacked by Fyre and sprayed poison mist into a referee's face that was intended for her. Four days later, at Deadline, the two had a match where Dawn was victorious. On 3 January 2023 episode of NXT, Dawn fought Fyre in an Extreme Resolution match, which she lost. On the 13 January episode of NXT Level Up, Dawn defeated Jakara Jackson.

Championships and accomplishments 
 Pro Wrestling Illustrated
 Ranked No. 96 of the top 100 female wrestlers in the PWI Women's 100 in 2019

References

External links 

 
 
 

1994 births
21st-century professional wrestlers
Living people
Scottish female professional wrestlers
Sportspeople from Glasgow